The following lists events from 2014 in Malta.

Incumbents
President: George Abela (until 4 April), Marie Louise Coleiro Preca (starting 4 April)
Prime Minister: Joseph Muscat

Events

January
1 January – Malta issued Public Transport changes. New buses were added later on

February
7-23 February – Malta competed in the 2014 Winter Olympics.
27 February -March 4 - The Malta Carnival 2014 was held

April
4 April – Marie Louise Coleiro Preca succeeded George Abela as President of Malta.
14 April – Malta became the first European state to add recognition of gender identity to its constitution as a protected category.

May
1 May - Air Malta celebrated its 40th anniversary with a A320 classic livery.
9-21 May – Malta hosted the 2014 UEFA European Under-17 Championship.
24 May – European Parliament election took place. Joseph Muscat won the election, being a member of European Parliament from 2014 to 2019.

June
20 June – The Civil Unions Act, 2014 was published, the Ministry for Home Affairs and National Security published a regulations, based on which, the country recognises same-sex unions performed abroad, regarded by the Ministry as having equivalent status to Malta's civil unions.

September
11 September – A ship full of migrants sank off Malta and around 500 migrants were killed.

November
15 November – The Junior Eurovision Song Contest 2014 was held at Malta Shipbuilding in Marsa.
21-22 November – The Malta Eurovision Song Contest 2015 was also held at Malta Shipbuilding in Marsa.

Events From Unknown Dates
Gozo Channel celebrated 35 years since its foundation in 1979.

See also
Malta in the Eurovision Song Contest 2014
2013–14 Maltese Premier League
Malta at the 2014 Winter Olympics
2013–14 Maltese FA Trophy
Public holidays in Malta

References

External links
Malta Events - Full Calendar of Events in Malta|Visit Malta

 
Years of the 21st century in Malta
Malta
2010s in Malta
Malta